"Booyong" is a locality in northern New South Wales, partially in Byron Shire and partially in the City of Lismore.
It is named after the Booyong, or ironwood tree.

For census purposes the locality is included in the village of Clunes.

It is the location of the Booyong Flora Reserve, now part of the Andrew Johnston Big Scrub Nature Reserve, which is one of the few known locations of the endangered plant Isoglossa eranthemoides.

The village is located on the North Coast railway line. The track work, bridges and platform for the former Booyong railway station remains. There are no buildings left in the station precinct.

History 
The Bundjalung people were the first inhabitants of the Booyong area. The locality takes its name from an ironwood tree.

In 2010, the biggest water gum in the Southern Hemisphere, located within the Booyong Flora Reserve, was added to the National Register of Big Trees.

Gallery

External links

References

Lismore, New South Wales
Populated places in New South Wales